The Medal of Merit in Labour is a civil medal awarded in Spain by the Council of Ministers in its gold category and by the Ministry of Labour in its silver and bronze categories to individuals or institutions excelling in a useful and exemplary conduct in the performance of any job, profession, or service usually exercised; or in compensation for damages and suffering suffered in the fulfillment of that professional duty.

Categories
 Gold Medal: Awarded by the Council of Ministers, equivalent to a Grand Cross, its laureates receive the style of Excelentísimo Señor (male) or Excelentísima Señora (female).
 Silver Medal: Awarded by the Ministry of Labour, equivalent to a Commander, its laureates receive the style of Ilustrísimo Señor (male) or Ilustrísima Señora (female).
 Bronze Medal: Awarded by the Ministry of Labour, equivalent to a Knight/Dame, its laureates do not receive any style.

References

Orders, decorations, and medals of Spain